Small nuclear ribonucleoprotein G is a protein that in humans is encoded by the SNRPG gene.

Interactions 

SNRPG has been shown to interact with DDX20 and TACC1.

References

Further reading

External links